Pelosoma is a genus of water scavenger beetles in the family Hydrophilidae. There are about seven described species in Pelosoma.

Species
These seven species belong to the genus Pelosoma:
 Pelosoma lafertei Mulsant, 1844
 Pelosoma mesosternalum Hinton & Ancona, 1934
 Pelosoma orientale
 Pelosoma ovulum Sharp, 1887
 Pelosoma pecki Smetana, 1984
 Pelosoma prosternale Sharp, 1882
 Pelosoma rufipes (Fleutiaux & Sallé, 1889)

References

Further reading

 

Hydrophilidae
Articles created by Qbugbot